"The Mother We Share" is the debut single by Scottish synth-pop band Chvrches from their debut studio album, The Bones of What You Believe. The song was re-released in the United Kingdom on 15 September 2013 by Virgin Records. The re-release peaked within the top 40 of the UK Singles Chart, reaching number 38 in September 2013. This made it their highest-charting single until 2019 when their collaboration with Marshmello's "Here With Me" reached number 9 on the UK Singles Chart in April 2019.

Critical reception
Michael Cragg of The Guardian gave the song a positive review, while noting the mood differences between the song and a previous Chvrches track, "Lies". He wrote that the song "tempers the monster synth riffs in favour of twinkling keyboards, padded drum claps and a central lyric that lends the whole thing a slightly melancholic edge."

Duncan Cooper of The Fader praised Lauren Mayberry's vocals, comparing them to those of Megan James of Purity Ring. Ian Cohen of Pitchfork also similarly wrote that "Lauren Mayberry's neon sing-song vocals makes Chvrches stand out in a crowded field", while stating that the song's "melodic concision and extroversion goes beyond even that of recent adaptors like Purity Ring." He also compared the song to the works by the electronic music duo The Knife.

Pitchfork ranked it number 191 on their list of the top 200 tracks of the 2010s so far in 2014. In 2013, the song won the Popjustice £20 Music Prize for best British pop song.

Music video
The music video for the song, directed by SJ Lee and featuring Alexandra Chelaru, was released on 5 August 2013. It alters between "a narrative of a lonely girl traversing her way through New York City" and flashy shots of Chvrches performing the track.

Remixes

Blood Diamonds remix
The song was remixed by electronic music producer Blood Diamonds. The remix appeared on Chvrches' Soundcloud page.

The remix received positive reviews from the critics. Jamie Milton of This Is Fake DIY wrote: "The original is spun into a giant, hyperactive beast of looped vocals and Lauren Mayberry being made to sound like she's shouting from several sides at once." Larry Fitzmaurice of Pitchfork stated that the remix "takes the original's pulsing chorus and throws some crazy drum'n'bass noise behind it." Michelle Geslani of Consequence of Sound felt that Blood Diamond "literally injected it with 10x more energy," while noting "the chorus, which bursts with the hyperactive, glitchy thrills." She also called the song a "somewhat of a perfect personification of the countdown to the full-length."

A JD Twitch Optimo remix
The song was also remixed by Scottish DJ, JD Twitch of the music duo Optimo. It was eventually included in the single.

In popular culture
"The Mother We Share" was used in 2014 Marc Jacobs commercial.

The song was covered by artists such as Half Moon Run, Soak and Eefje de Visser.

The song was also used in the soundtrack of the 2014 racing video game Forza Horizon 2, in the radio station Horizon Pulse.

Track listing

Personnel
 Lauren Mayberry – lead vocals, additional synthesizers
 Iain Cook – synthesizers, guitar, bass, vocals
 Martin Doherty – synthesizers, samplers, vocals

Charts

Weekly charts

Year-end charts

Certifications

Release history

References

2012 debut singles
2012 songs
Chvrches songs
Songs written by Iain Cook
Songs written by Lauren Mayberry
Songs written by Martin Doherty
Glassnote Records singles
Virgin Records singles